Bob Hobbs was an Australian rugby league footballer who played in the 1940s and 1950s.  He played for Canterbury-Bankstown, Western Suburbs and Parramatta as a second rower.

Playing career
Hobbs began his first grade career with Canterbury-Bankstown in 1945 after moving from Cowra in country New South Wales.  Hobbs played 4 games with the club but featured more for the reserve grade team.  In 1946, Hobbs joined Western Suburbs spending a solitary season with them making 4 appearances.  

Hobbs captain-coached Cootamundra in the 1948 Maher Cup and Group 9 competition, the team winning the premiership and NSW Country's Clayton Cup.

In 1949, Hobbs joined newly admitted side Parramatta and was a regular starter for the club over the following 6 seasons finishing as top point scorer for the side in 1952 and 1953.  Hobbs time at Parramatta was not a successful one though with the team finishing last on two occasions and finishing towards the bottom in the other years.

References

1926 births
2006 deaths
Parramatta Eels players
Canterbury-Bankstown Bulldogs players
Western Suburbs Magpies players
Australian rugby league players
Rugby league players from Cowra, New South Wales
Rugby league second-rows